Bree Bain (née Desborough; born 22 September 1979) is an Australian actress.  She is known for her role as Justine Welles in the soap opera Home and Away.

Early life
Bain was born in Sydney, New South Wales, Australia in 1979.

Bree married a Canadian man named Cale Bain and they have two children.

Career
Bain began her acting career in 1995, making her debut in a guest appearance in medical series G.P..  She made a guest appearance on Water Rats before landing her first major role on the soap opera Home and Away, playing the part of Justine Welles for three years from 1997 to 2000. Desborough tackled several controversial storylines as Justine, including drug addiction and false imprisonment for battering a baby who later died. 

She is also known for her role as Shelley Southall on the short-lived drama series Always Greener, for which she appeared from 2002 to 2003.  In 2004, Desborough played a small role in the television mini-series Salem's Lot, a remake of the 1979 cult mini-series, based on the novel by Stephen King.  

Her other television credits include the Canadian television series The Smart Woman Survival Guide, the television film Curse of the Iron Mask and All Saints.  In 2009, she appeared in her first feature film, I Wish I Were Stephanie V, with Clayton Watson and Kain O'Keeffe.

Filmography

Film

Television

References

External links

Actresses from Sydney
1979 births
Living people
Australian soap opera actresses